Mount Lebanon (jabal lubnān, ; , , , ṭūr lewnōn ) is a mountain range in Lebanon.

Geography

Lebanon has historically been defined by the mountains, which provided protection for the local population. In Lebanon, changes in scenery are related less to geographical distances than to altitudes. The mountains were known for their oak and pine forests. The last remaining old growth groves of the famous [[Cedrus libani|Cedar of Lebanon (Cedrus libani var. libanii)]] are on the high slopes of Mount Lebanon, in the Cedars of God World Heritage Site.

The Phoenicians used the forests from Mount Lebanon to build their ship fleet and to trade with their neighbors. The Phoenicians and successor rulers consistently replanted and restocked the range; even as late as the 16th century, its forested area was considerable.

Etymology
The name Mount Lebanon traces back to the Semitic root LBN, meaning "white", likely a reference to the snow-covered mountains.

History

Mount Lebanon is mentioned in the Old Testament numerous times. King Hiram I of Tyre sent engineers with cedar wood which was abundant in Mount Lebanon, to build the Solomon's Temple in Jerusalem. Since then the cedar species known scientifically as Cedrus libani is often associated with Mount Lebanon. The Phoenicians used cedar to build ships in which they sailed the Mediterranean, thus they were the first to establish villages in Mount Lebanon and would live from cutting down Cedars and sending them to the coast.

Eusebius records that the Emperor Constantine destroyed a temple of Venus 'on the summit of Mount Lebanon.'
After the 5th century AD, Christian monks who were followers of a hermit named Maron, arrived from the Orontes valley in Northern Syria and began preaching their religion to the inhabitants of the northernmost parts of the mountain range. In the late 8th century a group known as the Mardaites (also Jarajima) settled in North Lebanon following the order of the Byzantine Emperor; their mission was to raid Islamic territories in Syria. They merged with the local population, refusing to leave after the emperor struck a deal with the Muslim Caliph of Damascus; thus, they became part of the Maronite society. In 1291 after the fall of Acre, the last crusader outpost in the Levant, the remnants of the European settlers who succeeded in escaping capture by the Mamelukes, settled in the Northern part of Lebanon and become part of the Maronite society.

Mount Lebanon was visited and called home by many Muslim ascetics and Sufis since the 7th century, mentioned by many travelers to the region, few of which are known by name such as Shiban al-Muallah and Abbas al-Majnun. In the 10th century, Twelver Shia Muslim communities were likely established in Keserwan and the adjacent area to the north when Shia Islam was in the ascendant in Tripoli and the Islamic world at large. In the 13th century, a significant Shia population dominated Keserwan stretching out as far north as Dinniyeh, where reportedly the Shia feudal lord family, the Hamadas, were entrusted with tax-collecting in 1470. Subject to harsh military campaigns and state policies put-forth by the Mamluks and Ottomans over the centuries, this Shia population decreased over time and was driven to settle to the south in Jezzine and eastward in the western parts of the Bekaa valley, becoming a small minority in Mount Lebanon by the 19th century.

In the 9th century, tribes from the "Jabal el Summaq" area north of Aleppo in Syria began settling the southern half of the mountain range. These tribes were known as the Tanoukhiyoun and in the 11th century they converted to the Druze faith and ruled the areas of Mount Lebanon stretching from Metn in the north to Jezzine in the south. This entire area became known as the 'Jabal ad-Duruz'. In the early 17th century, Emir Fakhr-al-Din II was entrusted as the main tax-collector and land-assigner in the Druze part of the mountains known as the Chouf. In an effort to unify Mount Lebanon, Emir Fakhreddine opened the door to Christians and in particular the Maronite settlement of the Chouf and Metn.

Throughout the 18th century and into the 19th century more and more Maronites settled in the Druze regions of the Mount. The Druze viewed these Maronite settlements as a threat to their power in Mount Lebanon and in a series of clashes in the 1840s and 1860s, a miniature civil war erupted in the area resulting in the massacre of thousands of Christians. The Druze won militarily, but not politically, because European powers (mainly France and Britain) intervened on behalf of the Maronites and divided Mount Lebanon into two areas; Druze and Maronite. Seeing their authority decline in Mount Lebanon, a few Lebanese Druze began migrating to the new Jabal ad-Duruz in southern Syria. In 1861, the "Mount Lebanon" autonomous district was established within the Ottoman system, under an international guarantee.

For centuries, the Maronites of the region have been protected by the noble Khazen family, which was endowed the responsibility by Pope Clement X and King Louis XIV and given Cheikh'' status in return for guarding the princes Fakhr-al-Din II and Younès al-Maani. The Khazen crest reflects the family's special closeness to Mount Lebanon, with snowy mountains and a cedar tree depicted.

Political term

Mount Lebanon also lent its name to two political designations: an semi-autonomous province in Ottoman Syria that was established in 1861 and the central Governorate of modern Lebanon (see Mount Lebanon Governorate). The Mount Lebanon administrative region emerged in a time of rise of nationalism after the civil war of 1860. France intervened on behalf of the local Christian population and Britain on behalf of the Druze after the 1860 massacres in which 10,000 Christians were killed in clashes with the Druze. In 1861, the "Mount Lebanon" autonomous district was established within the Ottoman system, under an international guarantee. The Maronite Catholics and the Druze founded modern Lebanon in the early eighteenth century, through the ruling and social system known as the "Maronite-Druze dualism" in Mount Lebanon Mutasarrifate.

For decades, the Christians pressured the European powers to award them self determination by extending their small Lebanese territory to what they dubbed "Greater Lebanon", referring to a geographic unit comprising Mount Lebanon and its coast, and the Beqaa Valley to its east. After the First World War, France took hold of the formerly Ottoman holdings in the northern Levant, and expanded the borders of Mount Lebanon in 1920 to form Greater Lebanon, which was to be populated by remnants of the Middle Eastern Christian community. The Christians ended up gaining territorially, but the new borders merely ended the demographic dominance of Christians in the newly-created territory of Lebanon.

See also
 Cedars of God Nature Reserve
 Horsh Ehden Nature Reserve
 Mount Lebanon Governorate
 French Mandate of Lebanon
 Subdivisions of the Ottoman Empire
 Phoenice Libanensis

References

External links
 

Lebanon
Mountain ranges of Asia
History of Lebanon
Historical regions
Cultural regions
Regions of Lebanon